Frank TV is an American sketch comedy show starring Frank Caliendo, Mike MacRae, and Freddy Lockhart. Caliendo hosted the show and performed in sketches in full makeup as characters he impersonated.

Overview
The first episode of Frank TV premiered on November 20, 2007. The series was filmed in front of a live studio audience and featured an array of sketches filmed in front of various sets to resemble the likes of popular TV shows. In some sketches, Caliendo impersonated multiple characters on screen at once, such as one spoofing a Seinfeld reunion show set in the future where he plays Jerry, George, Kramer, Elaine, and Newman; and another with Al Pacino and Robert De Niro as movie critics.

Caliendo's castmates from Mad TV, Aries Spears and Mo Collins, guest starred on the show. Pat Kilbane and Pablo Francisco also guest starred but, they weren't on the show when Caliendo was. TBS promoted the show heavily during its baseball coverage, but the show garnered mixed reviews.

Advertising
TBS aired teaser commercials for the show during its coverage of Major League Baseball during the 2007 postseason. A teaser was also released and shown in movie theaters before the official trailers began. These ads featured Frank dressed up as one of his many characters, often 3–5 in the same advertisement.

Episodes

Season 1 (2007)

Season 2 (2008)

Cancellation
Frank TV was cancelled in January 2009. When asked about a third season, Caliendo commented by saying, "We’re not coming back. It hasn’t been announced, but we’re done. The time has come and gone for the show, unfortunately".

References

External links 
 Frank Caliendo's website
 Preview Clips on TBS
 

2007 American television series debuts
2008 American television series endings
2000s American sketch comedy television series
2000s American variety television series
English-language television shows
TBS (American TV channel) original programming
Television series by Studio T